Achchige Don Susil Premajayantha (born 10 January 1955) is a Sri Lankan politician, Cabinet Minister and a member of the Parliament of Sri Lanka.

Education
Premajayantha received his primary and secondary education at St. John's College, Nugegoda. After that he attended the University of Colombo and received a Bachelor of Laws in 1982 and became an Attorney at Law in 1984. Later on in 2004 he also gained a Masters in Public Administration from the University of Sri Jayewardenepura.

Political career
Premajayantha began his political career in 1991 being elected as the Deputy Chairman of Sri Jayewardenepura Kotte Urban Council.  In 1993 he was elected to the Western Provincial Council and was elected Chief Minister in 1995.

In 2000 he entered parliament for the first time from Gampaha District and became the Minister of Education. 
Even though the People's Alliance was defeated in the 2001 general elections, Premajayantha was elected back into the Parliament from Colombo District and held his seat in subsequent elections.

With the formation of the United People's Freedom Alliance in 2004, Premajayantha was made its inaugural General Secretary of the party. When the United People's Freedom Alliance won the 2004 general elections he was given the post of Minister of Power and Energy When Mahinda Rajapaksa became President, he was again appointed Minister of Education and after the 2010 general elections as the Minister of Petroleum Industries and in a 2013 cabinet reshuffle he became the Minister of Environment and Renewable Energy

On 25 August 2015, few days after general elections he resigned as the General Secretary of the United People's Freedom Alliance. Few days prior to the elections he was removed from the position by the party Chairman, President Maithripala Sirisena. After the Sri Lanka Freedom Party and United National Party signed a Memorandum of Understanding to form a National unity government, Premajayantha became the Minister of Technology and Research He was reappointed as the Minister of Education on the 20th of May 2022 by President Gotabaya Rajapaksa and again by President Ranil Wickramasinghe on the 23th of July 2022.

See also
Cabinet of Sri Lanka

Notes

References

External links

Living people
Provincial councillors of Sri Lanka
Alumni of St. John's College, Nugegoda
Chief Ministers of Western Province, Sri Lanka
Members of the 11th Parliament of Sri Lanka
Members of the 12th Parliament of Sri Lanka
Members of the 13th Parliament of Sri Lanka
Members of the 14th Parliament of Sri Lanka
Members of the 15th Parliament of Sri Lanka
Members of the 16th Parliament of Sri Lanka
Sri Lanka Podujana Peramuna politicians
1955 births
Power ministers of Sri Lanka